The 2006–07 Mid-American Conference men's basketball season began with practices in October 2006, followed by the start of the 2006–07 NCAA Division I men's basketball season in November. Conference play began in January 2007 and concluded in March 2007. Toledo won the regular season title with a conference record of 14–2 over second-place Akron. Fourth-seeded Miami defeated Akron in the final. In the NCAA tournament they lost in the first round to Oregon.

Preseason awards
The preseason poll was announced by the league office on October 24, 2006.

Preseason men's basketball poll
(First place votes in parenthesis)

East Division
 
 Ohio
 
 Miami

West Division
 
 
 
 
 Eastern Michigan

Honors

Postseason

Mid–American tournament

NCAA tournament

Postseason awards

Coach of the Year: Stan Joplin, Toledo
Player of the Year: Romeo Travis, Akron
Freshman of the Year: David Kool, Western Michigan
Defensive Player of the Year:  Kashif Payne, Toledo
Sixth Man of the Year: Cerdick Middleton, Akron

Honors

See also
2006–07 Mid-American Conference women's basketball season

References